, son of Ichijō Kaneka and adopted son of Takatsukasa Fusahiro , was a Kugyō or Japanese court noble of the Edo period (1603–1868). Sukehira was his adopted son.

Family 
Parents
Biological Father: Takatsukasa Fusahiro (鷹司 房熙, September 6, 1710 – June 9, 1730),
Father: Ichijō Kaneka (一条 兼香, January 12, 1692 – September 21, 1751)
Mother: Court lady
Adopted son
Takatsukasa Sukehira (鷹司 輔平, March 17, 1738 – February 8, 1813

References
 

1727 births
1743 deaths
Ichijō family
Takatsukasa family